Le Wazzou polygame (also known as Polygamic Wazzou or The Polygamist's Morale) is a 1971 Nigerien/French film about polygamy directed by and starring Oumarou Ganda. It was produced by Argos Films in France. It won the Grand Prize at the 1972 Panafrican Film and Television Festival of Ouagadougou and was the first official winner of that festival.

Cast
Oumarou Ganda
Joseph Salamatou
Zalika Souley
Garba Mamane
Amadou Seyni
Ousmane Diop

See also
Polygamy in Niger

References
Footnotes

Bibliography

External links

1971 films
Zarma-language films
French drama films
Nigerien drama films
Polygamy in fiction
Films about polygamy
1970s French films